Matej Kubs (born 26 May 1988) is a Slovak male volleyball player. He is part of the Slovakia men's national volleyball team. On club level he plays for VK Bystrina SPU Nitra.

References

External links
Profile at FIVB.org

1988 births
Living people
Slovak men's volleyball players
Place of birth missing (living people)